(3S)-2,3-epoxy-2,3-dihydrosqualene mutase may refer to:
 Thalianol synthase, an enzyme
 Protostadienol synthase, an enzyme
 Cucurbitadienol synthase, an enzyme
 Alpha-amyrin synthase, an enzyme
 Lupeol synthase, an enzyme
 Shionone synthase, an enzyme
 Parkeol synthase, an enzyme
 Achilleol B synthase, an enzyme
 Glutinol synthase, an enzyme
 Friedelin synthase, an enzyme
 Baccharis oxide synthase, an enzyme
 Alpha-seco-amyrin synthase, an enzyme
 Marneral synthase, an enzyme
 Beta-seco-amyrin synthase, an enzyme
 Delta-amyrin synthase, an enzyme
 Tirucalladienol synthase, an enzyme
 Baruol synthase, an enzyme